Bin Chhin (born 17 August 1949) is a Cambodian politician who has served as deputy prime minister of Cambodia since 2007. In March 2017, he was appointed the acting Minister in Charge of the Council of Ministers following Sok An's death. He is also the chairman of the National Authority for Land Dispute Resolution, in charge of solving the nation's land disputes. He is a Member of Parliament for the constituency of Prey Veng.

References

1949 births
Living people
Deputy Prime Ministers of Cambodia
Government ministers of Cambodia
Cambodian People's Party politicians
Members of the National Assembly (Cambodia)